Petrocallis is a genus of flowering plants belonging to the family Brassicaceae.

Its native range is Eastern Central and Southern Europe.

Species
Species:
 Petrocallis pyrenaica (L.) W.T.Aiton

References

Brassicaceae
Brassicaceae genera